The Men's 1,500m T13 had its first round held on September 10, beginning at 21:14 and the Final on September 13 at 20:20.

Medalists

Results

References
Round 1 - Heat 1
Round 1 - Heat 2
Round 1 - Heat 3
Final

Athletics at the 2008 Summer Paralympics